CBT-FM is a public radio station in Grand Falls-Windsor, Newfoundland and Labrador, Canada owned by the Canadian Broadcasting Corporation and broadcasting the CBC Radio One news and information network.

An AM station for many decades, in 2022, CBT transitioned to FM on 93.3 MHz with an effective radiated power of 100,000 watts from a transmitter near the town of Northern Arm. Four FM re-broadcasters provide additional coverage.

History

CBT launched in 1949 on 1350 kHz after the Broadcasting Corporation of Newfoundland, the pre-Confederation public broadcaster, was absorbed by the CBC when Newfoundland joined Canada. The frequency was changed to 990 kHz in 1956, and then to 540 kHz in 1963 (with 990 being reassigned to CBY in Corner Brook).

On 540 kHz, CBT transmitted with 10,000 watts using a non-directional antenna. It was a Class A station broadcasting on a Canadian and Mexican clear channel frequency from a transmitter on Crawley Avenue in Grand Falls-Windsor. Because it was at the bottom of the AM dial and on a clear channel frequency, CBT's signal could be heard over much of Central Newfoundland by day. At night, with a good radio, it covered most of Eastern North America.

On July 9, 2021, the CBC submitted an application to the CRTC to convert CBT 540 to 93.3 MHz with an effective radiated power of 100,000 watts (non-directional antenna with an effective height above average terrain of 193.6 metres). The application was approved on January 26, 2022 and CBT discontinued broadcasting on 540 kHz on December 31, 2022.

For much of CBT's history, the station was operated from a studio building located at 4 Harris Avenue in Grand Falls-Windsor. However, in order to cut costs, a reorganization of CBC's central Newfoundland operations was announced in 2013, leading to the closure of the Grand Falls-Windsor building in 2015. All staff and operations based in Grand Falls-Windsor were transferred to CBG in Gander.

Local programming
CBT produced its own local programming during the time it had a studio building in Grand Falls-Windsor. By the time the building closed in 2015, local programming was limited to contributions within The Central Morning Show produced at CBG in Gander. Following the closure of the building in Grand Falls-Windsor, this show became produced solely in Gander. 

In 2018, The Central Morning Show was replaced by CBC Newfoundland Morning, a joint production between CBG and CBY in Corner Brook that also airs on CBT.

For the remainder of local programming blocks within the CBC Radio One schedule, CBT broadcasts programming from CBN in St. John's.

Transmitters

References

External links
CBC Newfoundland and Labrador
 

BT
BT